This is a list of listed buildings in the Scottish Borders. The list is split out by parish.

 List of listed buildings in Abbey St Bathans, Scottish Borders
 List of listed buildings in Ancrum, Scottish Borders
 List of listed buildings in Ashkirk, Scottish Borders
 List of listed buildings in Ayton, Scottish Borders
 List of listed buildings in Bedrule, Scottish Borders
 List of listed buildings in Bowden, Scottish Borders
 List of listed buildings in Broughton, Glenholm And Kilbucho, Scottish Borders
 List of listed buildings in Bunkle And Preston, Scottish Borders
 List of listed buildings in Caddonfoot, Scottish Borders
 List of listed buildings in Castleton, Scottish Borders
 List of listed buildings in Cavers, Scottish Borders
 List of listed buildings in Channelkirk, Scottish Borders
 List of listed buildings in Chirnside, Scottish Borders
 List of listed buildings in Cockburnspath, Scottish Borders
 List of listed buildings in Coldingham, Scottish Borders
 List of listed buildings in Coldstream, Scottish Borders
 List of listed buildings in Crailing, Scottish Borders
 List of listed buildings in Cranshaws, Scottish Borders
 List of listed buildings in Drumelzier, Scottish Borders
 List of listed buildings in Duns, Scottish Borders
 List of listed buildings in Earlston, Scottish Borders
 List of listed buildings in Eccles, Scottish Borders
 List of listed buildings in Eckford, Scottish Borders
 List of listed buildings in Eddleston, Scottish Borders
 List of listed buildings in Ednam, Scottish Borders
 List of listed buildings in Edrom, Scottish Borders
 List of listed buildings in Ettrick, Scottish Borders
 List of listed buildings in Eyemouth, Scottish Borders
 List of listed buildings in Fala And Soutra, Scottish Borders
 List of listed buildings in Fogo, Scottish Borders
 List of listed buildings in Foulden, Scottish Borders
 List of listed buildings in Galashiels, Scottish Borders
 List of listed buildings in Gordon, Scottish Borders
 List of listed buildings in Greenlaw, Scottish Borders
 List of listed buildings in Hawick, Scottish Borders
 List of listed buildings in Heriot, Scottish Borders
 List of listed buildings in Hobkirk, Scottish Borders
 List of listed buildings in Hownam, Scottish Borders
 List of listed buildings in Hume, Scottish Borders
 List of listed buildings in Hutton, Scottish Borders
 List of listed buildings in Innerleithen, Scottish Borders
 List of listed buildings in Jedburgh, Scottish Borders
 List of listed buildings in Kelso, Scottish Borders
 List of listed buildings in Kirkhope, Scottish Borders
 List of listed buildings in Kirkurd, Scottish Borders
 List of listed buildings in Ladykirk, Scottish Borders
 List of listed buildings in Langton, Scottish Borders
 List of listed buildings in Lauder, Scottish Borders
 List of listed buildings in Legerwood, Scottish Borders
 List of listed buildings in Lilliesleaf, Scottish Borders
 List of listed buildings in Linton, Scottish Borders
 List of listed buildings in Longformacus, Scottish Borders
 List of listed buildings in Lyne, Scottish Borders
 List of listed buildings in Makerstoun, Scottish Borders
 List of listed buildings in Manor, Scottish Borders
 List of listed buildings in Maxton, Scottish Borders
 List of listed buildings in Melrose, Scottish Borders
 List of listed buildings in Mertoun, Scottish Borders
 List of listed buildings in Minto, Scottish Borders
 List of listed buildings in Mordington, Scottish Borders
 List of listed buildings in Morebattle, Scottish Borders
 List of listed buildings in Nenthorn, Scottish Borders
 List of listed buildings in Newlands, Scottish Borders
 List of listed buildings in Oxnam, Scottish Borders
 List of listed buildings in Peebles, Scottish Borders
 List of listed buildings in Penicuik, Scottish Borders
 List of listed buildings in Polwarth, Scottish Borders
 List of listed buildings in Roberton, Scottish Borders
 List of listed buildings in Roxburgh, Scottish Borders
 List of listed buildings in Selkirk, Scottish Borders
 List of listed buildings in Skirling, Scottish Borders
 List of listed buildings in Smailholm, Scottish Borders
 List of listed buildings in Southdean, Scottish Borders
 List of listed buildings in Sprouston, Scottish Borders
 List of listed buildings in St Boswells, Scottish Borders
 List of listed buildings in Stichill, Scottish Borders
 List of listed buildings in Stobo, Scottish Borders
 List of listed buildings in Stow, Scottish Borders
 List of listed buildings in Swinton, Scottish Borders
 List of listed buildings in Teviothead, Scottish Borders
 List of listed buildings in Traquair, Scottish Borders
 List of listed buildings in Tweedsmuir, Scottish Borders
 List of listed buildings in Westruther, Scottish Borders
 List of listed buildings in Whitsome, Scottish Borders
 List of listed buildings in Yarrow, Scottish Borders
 List of listed buildings in Yetholm, Scottish Borders

Scottish Borders